Aftermath: Population Zero (also titled Aftermath: The World After Humans) is a two-hour Canadian special documentary film that premiered on Sunday, March 9, 2008 (at 8:00 PM ET/PT) on the National Geographic Channel. The program was produced by Cream Productions.

Similar to the History Channel's special Life After People, Aftermath features what scientists and others speculate the earth, animal life, and plant life might be like if humanity no longer existed, as well as the effect that humanity's disappearance would have on the artifacts of civilization.
Both documentaries are inspired by Alan Weisman's The World Without Us.

A follow-up 4-part TV series was created, Aftermath, following different scenarios and what happens.

See also 
The World Without Us
Life After People
Cream Productions
 Aftermath (2010 TV series)
The Future Is Wild

References

External links 

 
 
 

National Geographic (American TV channel) original programming
Canadian documentary television films
Documentary films about environmental issues
Human extinction
Thought experiments